Damian Watcyn Lewis  (born 11 February 1971) is an English actor, presenter and producer. He is best known for portraying U.S. Army Major Richard Winters in the HBO miniseries Band of Brothers, which earned him a Golden Globe nomination. He also portrayed U.S. Marine Gunnery Sergeant Nicholas Brody in the Showtime series Homeland, which earned him a Primetime Emmy Award and a Golden Globe Award. His performance as Henry VIII of England in Wolf Hall earned him his third Primetime Emmy nomination and fourth Golden Globe nomination. He portrayed Bobby Axelrod in the Showtime series Billions in the first five seasons and appeared in Once Upon a Time in Hollywood (2019) as actor Steve McQueen.

Early life
Lewis was born on 11 February 1971 in St John's Wood, London, the eldest son of Charlotte Mary (née Bowater) and John Watcyn Lewis, a City insurance broker with Lloyd's. His paternal grandparents were Welsh. His maternal grandfather was Lieutenant-Colonel Sir Ian Bowater, Lord Mayor of London, and his maternal grandmother's ancestors include Bertrand, Viscount Dawson of Penn (a doctor to the Royal Family) and the eminent naval shipbuilder (see Yarrow Shipbuilders) and philanthropist Sir Alfred Yarrow, 1st Baronet, who was of partial 
Sephardic Jewish descent. He has stated that he "went to English boarding schools and grew up around people very much like [his character] Soames and in a milieu very much like the Forsytes.

As a child, Lewis made several visits to the US to visit relatives during summer breaks. He first decided to become an actor at the age of 16. He was educated at the independent Ashdown House School in Forest Row, East Sussex, and at Eton College. He graduated from the Guildhall School of Music and Drama in 1993, after which he worked as an actor with the Royal Shakespeare Company.

During his time with the RSC, he played Borgheim in Adrian Noble's production of Henrik Ibsen's Little Eyolf and Posthumus in William Shakespeare's Cymbeline. He also starred in another of Ibsen's plays, as Karsten Bernick in Pillars of the Community at the National Theatre in November 2005.

Career
Lewis once worked as a telemarketer selling car alarms, a job he detested. His first television appearance was as a medical student in "Hickory Dickory Dock", an episode of Poirot, broadcast in 1995. He also appeared as a rakish student in an early episode of the drama series A Touch of Frost (1996). He appeared in Robinson Crusoe (1997) as Patrick Conner. He appeared in Jonathan Kent's production of Hamlet, playing Laertes. This production was seen by Steven Spielberg, who later cast Lewis as Richard Winters in Band of Brothers (2001), the first role of several that required him to have a credible American accent.

He was in the 2000 series called Hearts and Bones as the love interest of Dervla Kirwan. Subsequently, Lewis portrayed Soames Forsyte in the ITV series The Forsyte Saga, which earned him positive reviews. He returned to the US to star in Dreamcatcher, a Lawrence Kasdan film about a man who becomes possessed by an evil alien. The character is American but when possessed he takes on a British accent. On the heels of this role, he starred in Keane as a Manhattanite with a fragile mental state who is searching for his missing daughter. Despite the film's poor box-office, Lewis's performance in the role was very well reviewed.

He played Jeffrey Archer in the TV special Jeffrey Archer: The Truth. Since 2004, he has appeared in a number of films, as well as the 2005 BBC TV adaptation of the Shakespeare comedy Much Ado About Nothing, as part of the ShakespeaRe-Told season. Lewis played the role of Yassen Gregorovich in the film Stormbreaker. In 2006, he appeared in Stephen Poliakoff's BBC drama Friends and Crocodiles. He has appeared on BBC's Have I Got News for You as guest host several times; on 10 November 2006, 1 May 2009, 18 November 2010, 27 April 9 November 2012 and 31 October 2014.

In 2008, Lewis starred as the main character Charlie Crews in the American television series Life on NBC. The show premiered in the US on 26 September 2007 and was affected by the 2007–08 Writers Guild of America strike. Only half of the first season's shows were produced. Regardless, the show won a 2008 AFI Award for best television series. Although the show received critical acclaim, when it returned the following television season, it was shuffled from night to night, and eventually cancelled by NBC to clear its time slot for The Jay Leno Show.

Lewis appeared the following year in the lead role in The Baker, a film directed by his brother, Gareth. Damian took a supporting role of Rizza in The Escapist, which he also helped produce. He led the cast in Martin Crimp's version of Molière's comedy, The Misanthrope, which opened in December 2009 at the Comedy Theatre, London. Other cast members included Tara Fitzgerald, Keira Knightley and Dominic Rowan.

Lewis played Tory Prime Minister Simon Laity in two seasons of Number 10 on BBC Radio 4.

He played Gareth, the father of an 11-year-old Liverpool F.C. fan, in the 2011 film Will.

From 2011 to 2013, Lewis had a starring role as Gunnery Sergeant Nicholas Brody in the Showtime series Homeland. In 2013, he narrated poetry for The Love Book App, an "interactive anthology of love literature developed by Allie Byrne Esiri".

From 2016 to 2021, he starred as billionaire hedge fund manager Bobby Axelrod in the Showtime series Billions.

Honours
Lewis was appointed Officer of the Order of the British Empire (OBE) in the 2014 Birthday Honours for services to drama and Commander of the Order of the British Empire (CBE) in the 2022 Birthday Honours for services to drama and charity.

Personal life

Lewis suffered a period of depression following a motorcycle accident in North London in 1998.

Having previously dated Katie Razzall, Kristin Davis and Sophia Myles, Lewis married actress Helen McCrory on 4 July 2007. They have a daughter, Manon (born 2006) and a son, Gulliver (born 2007). McCrory died of cancer on 16 April 2021, aged 52.

Lewis and his family left the UK in 2007 to live in Los Angeles while he worked on the NBC-TV crime drama Life. After completion of that series' final episode in 2009, they returned to the UK to live in a Victorian townhouse in Tufnell Park, north London.
They also have a house near Sudbury in Suffolk.

In 2010, Lewis became a trade justice ambassador for the charity Christian Aid. In May 2006 and June 2018, he played for England in Soccer Aid, and played golf for Europe in the All*Star Cup in August 2006, both shown on ITV.

Lewis is a supporter of Liverpool F.C.

During the COVID-19 pandemic, Lewis and McCrory supported Feed NHS, a fundraiser to give food from high street restaurants to NHS staff. By April 2020, they had raised £1m for the charity. The initiative started in London, but following its success, plans were announced to roll it out to other cities in the UK.

Filmography

Film

Television

Stage

Awards and nominations

References

External links

 Interview with Charlie Rose—A compilation of Rose's interviews with Claire Danes and Damian Lewis, the stars of the hit drama Homeland. 2 January 2014.

1971 births
Living people
20th-century English male actors
21st-century English male actors
Alumni of the Guildhall School of Music and Drama
Best Drama Actor Golden Globe (television) winners
English film producers
English male film actors
English male radio actors
English male Shakespearean actors
English male stage actors
English male television actors
English male voice actors
English people of German-Jewish descent
English people of Spanish-Jewish descent
English people of Welsh descent
Male actors from London
Commanders of the Order of the British Empire
Outstanding Performance by a Lead Actor in a Drama Series Primetime Emmy Award winners
People educated at Ashdown House
People educated at Eton College
People from St John's Wood
Royal Shakespeare Company members